Pattathari is a 2016 Indian Tamil-language romantic action film written and directed by A.R. Sankara Pandi.

Plot 
The story focuses on the friendship between five people who do not care about taking responsibilities on their shoulders even after graduation and how their life changes forms the rest of the story.

Cast 
 Abi Saravanan as Siva 
 Adhiti Menon as Ilakiya 
 Mahanadi Shankar
 Athira Santhosh
 Ambani Shankar

Soundtrack
Soundtrack was composed by S. S. Kumaran.
"Single Sim" - Vaikom Vijayalakshmi
"Kannodu" - Chinmayi
"Pattathari" - Naresh Iyer
"Bencha Thodachavan" - Prasanna

Release 
The Times of India gave the film one-and-a-half out of five stars and wrote that "Save for Adhiti, who is expressive and is a promising find, the other actors lack screen presence, and barely register". The Times of India Samayam gave the film two-and-a-half out of five stars.

References

External links
 Facebook

2010s Tamil-language films
2010s romantic action films
Indian romantic action films